A Burns supper is a celebration of the life and poetry of the poet Robert Burns (25 January 175921 July 1796), the author of many Scots poems. The suppers are normally held on or near the poet's birthday, 25 January, known as Burns Night (also called Robert Burns Day or Rabbie Burns Day (or Robbie Burns Day in Canada). However, in principle, celebrations may be held at any other time of the year. Burns suppers are held all around the world.

History

The first supper was held in memoriam at Burns Cottage in Ayrshire by Burns's friends, on 21 July 1801, the fifth anniversary of his death; it has been a regular occurrence ever since. The first still extant Burns Club was founded in Greenock in 1801 by merchants who were born in Ayrshire, some of whom had known Burns. They held the first Burns supper on what they thought was his birthday, 29 January 1802, but in 1803, they discovered the Ayr parish records that noted his date of birth was actually 25 January 1759. Since then, suppers have been held on or about 25 January.

The Scottish Parliament considers the celebration of Burns Night each year to be a key cultural heritage event.The Parliament welcomes the annual celebration of Scotland’s national poet, Robert Burns, which is held on 25 January each year to mark the Bard’s birthday; considers that Burns was one of the greatest poets and that his work has influenced thinkers across the world; notes that Burns' first published collection, Poems Chiefly in the Scottish Dialect, also known as the "Kilmarnock Edition", published in 1786, did much to popularise and champion the Scots language, and considers that this is one of his most important legacies; believes that the celebration of Burns Night is an opportunity to raise awareness of the cultural significance of Scots and its status as one of the indigenous languages of Scotland, and further believes in the importance of the writing down of the Scots language to ensure its continuation through written documentation, as well as oral tradition.
Burns suppers may be formal or informal. Both typically include haggis (a traditional Scottish dish celebrated by Burns in Address to a Haggis), Scotch whisky and the recitation of Burns's poetry. Formal dinners are hosted by organisations such as universities, sporting clubs, Burns Clubs, the Freemasons or St. Andrew's Societies; they occasionally end with dancing or a cèilidh. During the global COVID-19 pandemic in 2021, Burns Night celebrations moved online and were popular amongst families eating at home.  Formal suppers follow a standard order.

Standard order

Piping in guests
A bagpiper generally greets the guests, who gather and mix as at any informal party. At less formal gatherings, traditional Scottish music is played.

Host's welcoming speech 
The host says a few words, welcoming everyone to the supper and perhaps stating the reason for it.

All the guests are seated and grace is said, usually using the "", a well-known thanksgiving said before meals that uses the Scots language. Although attributed to Burns, the Selkirk Grace was already known in the 17th century as the "Galloway Grace" or the "Covenanters' Grace". It came to be called the Selkirk Grace because Burns was said to have delivered it at a dinner given by Dunbar Douglas, 4th Earl of Selkirk.

Selkirk Grace

Soup course

The supper starts with the soup course.  Normally a Scottish soup, such as Scotch broth, potato soup, cullen skink, or cock-a-leekie, is served.

Haggis

Piping in the haggis 

Everyone stands as the haggis is brought in. Haggis is a meat dish but in recent decades, a vegetarian alternative is often available. It is usually brought in by the cook on a large dish, generally while a bagpiper leads the way to the host's table, where the haggis is laid down. "A Man's A Man for A' That", "Robbie Burns Medley" or "The Star O' Robbie Burns" might be played. The host, or perhaps a guest, then recites the 
Address to a Haggis.

"Address to a Haggis" 

At the line , the speaker normally draws and sharpens a knife. At the line , he plunges it into the haggis and cuts it open from end to end.  When done properly, the "ceremony" is a highlight of the evening.

Main course 

At the end of the poem, a whisky toast will be proposed to the haggis, and the company will sit down to the meal. The haggis is traditionally served with mashed potatoes (tatties) and mashed swede turnip (neeps).

Other courses
A dessert course, cheese courses, coffee, etc., may also be part of the meal. The courses normally use traditional Scottish recipes. For instance, dessert may be cranachan or tipsy laird (whisky trifle), followed by oatcakes and cheese, all washed down with the "water of life", Scotch whisky.

Toasts
When the meal reaches the coffee stage, various speeches and toasts are given.

Immortal memory 
The main speaker gives a speech remembering some aspect of Burns's life or poetry. It may be either light-hearted or serious, and may include the recitation of a poem or a song by Burns. A toast to the Immortal Memory of Robert Burns then follows.

Address to the Lassies 
This was originally a short speech given by a male guest in thanks to the women who had prepared the meal. However, it is now much more wide-ranging and generally covers the male speaker's view on women. It is normally amusing and not offensive, particularly since it will be followed by a reply from the "lassies" concerned. The men drink a toast to the women's health.

Reply to the Laddies 
This is occasionally (and humorously) called the "Toast to the Laddies". Like the previous toast, it is generally now quite wide-ranging. A female guest will give her views on men and reply to any specific points raised by the previous speaker. Like the previous speech, it should be amusing but not offensive. Quite often, the speakers giving this toast and the previous one will collaborate so that the two toasts complement each other.

Works by Burns 
After the speeches there may be singing of songs by Burns (such as "Ae Fond Kiss", "Such a Parcel of Rogues in a Nation", and "A Man's A Man for A' That") and more poetry (such as "To a Mouse", "To a Louse",  "Tam o' Shanter", "The Twa Dogs", and "Holy Willie's Prayer").

That may be done by the individual guests or by invited experts, and it goes on for as long as the guests wish. It may include other works by poets influenced by Burns, particularly poets writing in Scots. Foreign guests may also be invited to sing or say works from their land.

Closing 
Finally, the host will call on one of the guests to give the vote of thanks. Then, everyone is asked to stand, join hands, and sing  "" to bring the evening to an end.

See also 

 Burns' Day storm
 List of dining events
Scottish cuisine

References

External links

A 2007 Supper for Mauchline Burns Club, presented with explanations of each stage
A recital of Address to a Haggis
  Address to the Unco Guid or the rigidly righteous 
A film recording of the 145th Burns Supper from 1971 at the Irvine Burns Club.
 Largest Burns supper
BBC - Robert Burns - Readers

Canadian traditions
Dining events
Events in Scotland
Haggis
January observances
Language observances
Cultural depictions of Robert Burns
Scottish cuisine
Scottish culture
Scottish traditions
Winter events in Scotland